Rubus permixtus is an uncommon North American species of flowering plant in the rose family. It grows in scattered locations in the north-central and northeastern United States, from Maine south as far as West Virginia plus Michigan and Wisconsin. Nowhere is it very common.

Rubus permixtus is a nearly prostrate shrub that runs along the ground as much as 6 feet (180 cm), with vertical stems arising from those on the ground. Fruits are generally black, sweet, and edible.

The genetics of Rubus is extremely complex, so that it is difficult to decide on which groups should be recognized as species. There are many rare species with limited ranges such as this. Further study is suggested to clarify the taxonomy. Some studies have suggested that R. permixtus may have originated as a hybrid between R. flagellaris and R. hispidus.

References

permixtus
Plants described in 1906
Flora of the United States